Nutrixxion–Abus was a German UCI Continental cycling team that existed from 2005 until 2013. CCS Germany GmbH, a limited liability company, owned Nutrixxion–Abus. The team was managed by Mark Claussmeyer and used KTM bicycles.

Major wins 

2005
Stage 4 Cinturón a Mallorca, André Schulze
Stage 3a Five Rings of Moscow, André Schulze
Stage 7 Tour de l'Avenir, Alexander Gottfried
2006
Stage 3 Cinturón a Mallorca, Stefan Parinussa
Stage 4 Thüringen Rundfahrt, Mark Cavendish
Stage 1 Flèche du Sud, Tom Flammang
Stages 4 & 5 Flèche du Sud, Stefan Parinussa
Stages 4 & 5 Tour de Berlin, Mark Cavendish
Stage 4b Tour de Beauce, Richard Faltus
Stage 3 Course de la Solidarité Olympique, Mark Cavendish
2007
Overall Cinturón a Mallorca, Richard Faltus
Stage 5 Course de la Solidarité Olympique, Tilo Schüler
2008
Overall Cinturón a Mallorca, Dirk Müller
Stage 5, Dirk Müller
Overall GP of Sochi, Dirk Müller
Stages 1 & 3, Dirk Müller
Stage 5 Tour de Beauce, Andreas Schillinger
Stage 4 GP Torres Vedras, Richard Faltus
Stage 5 GP Torres Vedras, Dirk Müller
Sparkassen Giro Bochum, Eric Baumann
Praha-Karlovy Vary-Praha, Eric Baumann
2009
Beverbeek Classic, Andreas Schillinger
Stages 1b & 2 Five Rings of Moscow, Eric Baumann
Stage 5 Five Rings of Moscow, Andreas Schillinger
Stage 4 GP CTT Correios de Portugal, Eric Baumann
2010
Stage 4 Volta ao Alentejo, Steffen Radochla
Pomerania Tour, Dirk Müller
Overall Dookoła Mazowsza, Sebastian Forke
Stages 1, 2, 3 & 4, Sebastian Forke
Overall Tour of China, Dirk Müller
Prologue & Stage 5, Dirk Müller
Stage 3 Tour de Seoul, Grischa Janorschke
2011
Overall GP of Sochi, Björn Schröder
Stage 1, Grischa Janorschke
Stage 4 Course de la Solidarité Olympique, Steffen Radochla
Stage 5 Tour de Bulgaria, Erik Mohs
2012
Stage 2 Five Rings of Moscow, Michael Schweizer
Stage 6 Tour of Taihu Lake, Sebastian Körber

2013 squad 
As of 18 January 2013.

References

External links

UCI Continental Teams (Europe)
Cycling teams based in Germany
Defunct cycling teams based in Germany
Cycling teams established in 2005
Cycling teams disestablished in 2013
Sport in Dortmund